Ceber  is a village in the administrative district of Gmina Bogoria, within Staszów County, Świętokrzyskie Voivodeship, in south-central Poland.

The village has a population of  188.

Demography 
According to the 2002 Poland census, there were 211 people residing in Ceber village, of whom 53.6% were male and 46.4% were female. In the village, the population was spread out, with 23.7% under the age of 18, 32.7% from 18 to 44, 22.3% from 45 to 64, and 21.3% who were 65 years of age or older.
 Figure 1. Population pyramid of village in 2002 – by age group and sex

References

Villages in Staszów County